The SN postcode area, also known as the Swindon postcode area, is a group of eighteen postcode districts in England, within ten post towns. These cover north Wiltshire (including Swindon, Chippenham, Calne, Corsham, Devizes, Malmesbury, Marlborough, Melksham and Pewsey), plus a small part of south-west Oxfordshire (including Faringdon) and a very small part of Gloucestershire.



Coverage
The approximate coverage of the postcode districts:

|-
! SN1
| SWINDON
| Swindon town centre south of the railway line, Old Town, southwest suburbs
| Swindon
|-
! SN2
| SWINDON
| Swindon town centre north of the railway line, inner suburbs to the north and northwest including Upper Stratton and Kingsdown
| Swindon
|-
! SN3
| SWINDON
| Swindon east suburbs, Stratton St Margaret, South Marston
| Swindon
|-
! SN4
| SWINDON
| Royal Wootton Bassett, Clyffe Pypard, Broad Town, Broad Hinton, Wroughton, Chiseldon, Liddington, Wanborough, Hinton Parva
| Swindon, Wiltshire
|-
! SN5
| SWINDON
| West Swindon, Lydiard Millicent, Purton
| Swindon, Wiltshire
|-
! SN6
| SWINDON
| Highworth, Cricklade, Shrivenham, Watchfield, Ashton Keynes, Ashbury, Bishopstone, Castle Eaton, Hannington, Idstone, Marston Meysey, Leigh
| Swindon, Wiltshire, Vale of White Horse
|-
! SN7
| FARINGDON
| Faringdon, Stanford in the Vale, Uffington, Longcot, Fernham, Buckland, Great Coxwell, Little Coxwell, Littleworth, Shellingford, Buscot
| Vale of White Horse
|-
! SN8
| MARLBOROUGH
| Marlborough, Ramsbury, Mildenhall, Aldbourne, Axford, Burbage, Baydon, Great Bedwyn
| Wiltshire
|-
! SN9
| PEWSEY
| Pewsey, Upavon, Enford
| Wiltshire
|-
! SN10
| DEVIZES
| Devizes, Market Lavington, Rowde
| Wiltshire
|-
! SN11
| CALNE
| Calne, Heddington, Hilmarton
| Wiltshire
|-
! SN12
| MELKSHAM
| Melksham, Bowerhill, Seend, Broughton Gifford
| Wiltshire
|-
! SN13
| CORSHAM
| Corsham, Box, Neston
| Wiltshire
|-
! SN14
| CHIPPENHAM
| Chippenham (west), Marshfield, Kington St Michael, Hullavington, Luckington, Grittleton, Yatton Keynell, Biddestone, Colerne
| Wiltshire, South Gloucestershire
|-
! SN15
| CHIPPENHAM
| Chippenham (east), Bromham, Sandy Lane, Lacock, Burleaze, Pewsham, Monkton Park, Foxham, Dauntsey, Seagry, Christian Malford, Bradenstoke, Sutton Benger, Lyneham, Draycot Cerne, Cleverton, Little Somerford, Langley Burrell, Great Somerford, Brinkworth
| Wiltshire
|-
! style="background:#FFFFFF;"|SN15
| style="background:#FFFFFF;"|CORSHAM
| style="background:#FFFFFF;"|
| style="background:#FFFFFF;"|non-geographic
|-
! SN16
| MALMESBURY
| Sherston, Malmesbury, Crudwell, Minety
| Wiltshire
|-
! SN25
| SWINDON
| Swindon outer north suburbs including Haydon Wick and Priory Vale; Blunsdon St Andrew
| Swindon
|-
! SN26
| SWINDON
| Blunsdon
| Swindon
|-
! style="background:#FFFFFF;"|SN38
| style="background:#FFFFFF;"|SWINDON
| style="background:#FFFFFF;"|Nationwide Building Society
| style="background:#FFFFFF;"|non-geographic
|-
! style="background:#FFFFFF;"|SN99
| style="background:#FFFFFF;"|SWINDON
| style="background:#FFFFFF;"|
| style="background:#FFFFFF;"|non-geographic
|}

The SN25 and SN26 districts were formed out of the SN2 district in 1999.

Map

See also
Postcode Address File
List of postcode areas in the United Kingdom

References

External links
Royal Mail's Postcode Address File
A quick introduction to Royal Mail's Postcode Address File (PAF)

Swindon
Postcode areas covering South West England